Sakura Kokumai (born October 2, 1992) is an American karateka. She won the gold medal in the women's individual kata event at the 2019 Pan American Games held in Lima, Peru. She represented the United States in the women's kata event at the 2020 Summer Olympics in Tokyo, Japan.

Career 

In 2012, she won a bronze medal in the individual kata event at the World Karate Championships held in Paris, France. The following year, she won the bronze medal in the women's kata event at the 2013 World Combat Games held in Saint Petersburg, Russia. In 2014, she won the gold medal in the women's kata event at the Pan American Sports Festival held in Tlaxcala, Mexico. She won the silver medal in her event at the 2016 World University Karate Championships held in Braga, Portugal.

At the 2017 World Games held in Wrocław, Poland, she lost her bronze medal match against Sandy Scordo of France in the women's kata event. In 2018, she competed in the women's individual kata event at the World Karate Championships held in Madrid, Spain where she was eliminated in her third match by Viviana Bottaro of Italy. In 2019, she competed in the women's individual kata event at the World Beach Games held in Doha, Qatar without winning a medal. She finished in 5th place.

In April 2021, during a training session, she was subjected to anti-Asian harassment, of which she captured the incident via Instagram.

At the 2020 Summer Olympics in Tokyo, Japan, she competed in the women's kata where she lost her bronze medal match against Viviana Bottaro of Italy. A few months after the Olympics, she also lost her bronze medal match against Bottaro in the women's individual kata event at the 2021 World Karate Championships held in Dubai, United Arab Emirates.

She competed in the women's kata event at the 2022 World Games held in Birmingham, United States.

Achievements

References

External links 
 

Living people
1992 births
American female karateka
Shitō-ryū practitioners
Waseda University alumni
Sportspeople from Honolulu
American sportspeople of Japanese descent
Competitors at the 2017 World Games
Competitors at the 2022 World Games
Karateka at the 2019 Pan American Games
Medalists at the 2019 Pan American Games
Pan American Games medalists in karate
Pan American Games gold medalists for the United States
Karateka at the 2020 Summer Olympics
Olympic karateka of the United States
21st-century American women